Montinee Tangphong (30 April 1985 – 4 November 2020) was a Thai professional tennis player.

She won two singles titles and two doubles titles on tournaments of the ITF Circuit and took part in many WTA Tour events. Her career-high singles ranking was No. 272, achieved on 29 May 2006.

ITF finals

Singles: 6 (2–4)

Doubles: 6 (2–4)

References
 
 

1985 births
2020 deaths
Montinee Tangphong
Tennis players at the 2006 Asian Games
Montinee Tangphong
Montinee Tangphong
Southeast Asian Games medalists in tennis
Competitors at the 2005 Southeast Asian Games
Montinee Tangphong
Montinee Tangphong
Montinee Tangphong